CTD small phosphatase-like protein is an enzyme that in humans is encoded by the CTDSPL gene.

Interactions
CTDSPL has been shown to interact with SNAI1.

References

Further reading

External links